The Roman Catholic Suburbicarian Diocese of Ostia is an ecclesiastical territory located within the Metropolitan City of Rome in Italy. It is one of the seven suburbicarian dioceses. The incumbent Bishop is cardinal Giovanni Battista Re. Since 1150, its bishop has been the Dean of the College of Cardinals, Its Cathedral is Basilica di Sant'Aurea.

From 1105 to 1914, the diocese was merged with the Suburbicarian Diocese of Velletri. In 1962, the Diocese of Ostia was brought under the direct administration of the Diocese of Rome.

Bishops

Bishops of Ostia (-1057)

[Maximus (259)]
...
Maximus (313)
Florentius (366)
...
Bonus (487).
Bellator (499)
Aristus (502)
...
Amabile (649)
...
Andrea(s) (680)
...
Sissinio 732 – before 745
Theodorus (745)
 George I, 753–786
...
 Gregory I, 787 – before 804
 Bernard 804–805
 Peter I 805 – before 826
 Cesareo 826–854
 Megisto (or Leo I), 854–868
 Donatus, 868–870
sede vacante 870–878
 Eugenius, 878–898
 Stephen, 898–900
 Guido I, 900–946
 Benigno, 946–960
 Siccone, 960–963
 Gregory II, 964–969
 Leo II, 969–983
vacant 983–996
 Azzone I, 996
 Gregory III, 998–1012
 Azzone II, 1012–1021
 Peter III, 1021–1037
 Benedict, 1044–1050
 John I, 1050–1058

Bishops of Ostia and Velletri (1057-1378)

 Peter IV Damiani, 1057–1072
 Gerald of Ostia, 1072–1077
 Odo I de Lagery, 1078–1088 (became Pope Urban II)
 Odo II, 1088–1102
 Leo of Ostia, ca. 1103–1115
 Lamberto Scannabecchi, 1116–1124 (later Pope Honorius II)
 Giovanni of Camaldoli, 1126–1134
 Drogo of Champagne, 1136–1138
 Alberic, 1138–1148
 Guido II de Summa, 1149–1151
 Hugo, 1151–1158
 Ubaldo Allucingoli, 1159–1181/84 (became Pope Lucius III in 1181)
 Theobald, 1184–1188
 Ottaviano di Paoli, 1189–1206
 Ugolino di Conti 1206–1227/31 (became Pope Gregory IX)
 Rinaldo dei Signori di Ienne, 1231–1254/61 (became Pope Alexander IV in 1254)
 Hugh of Saint-Cher 1261–1262
 Enrico Bartolomei 1262–1271
vacant 1271–1273
 Peter VI de Tarentaise, 1273–1276 (later Pope Innocent V, † 1276)
 vacant 1276–1278
 Latino Malabranca Orsini, 1278–1294
 Hugh Aycelin, 1294–1297
 Leonardo Patrasso, apostolic administrator 1298–1299
 Niccolo I Boccasini, 1300–1303 (became Pope Benedict XI)
 Niccolò Albertini, 1303–1321
 Regnaud de La Porte, 1321–1325
vacant 1325–1327
 Bertrand du Pouget, 1327–1352
 Étienne Aubert, 1352
 Pierre Bertrand de Colombier, 1353–1361
 Andouin Aubert, 1361–1363
 Hélias de Saint-Yrieix, 1363–1367
 Guillaume de la Sudrie, 1367–1373
 Peter d'Estaing, O.S.B.  1373–1377
 Bertrand Lagier, 1378 (sided with of Avignon in the Great Schism)

Western Schism

Obedience of Rome (1378–1415) (actually in control of Ostia)
Philippe of Alençon, 1388–1397 (also Cardinal-bishop of Sabina, 1380–1388)
Angelo Acciaioli, 1405–1408

Obedience of Avignon (1378–1429)
Bertrand Lagier (1378–1392)
John de Neufchatel (1392–1398)
Leonardo Rossi da Giffoni (1398–1405)
Jean-Allarmet de Brogny (1405–1408)
Julian Lobera y Valtierra (1423–1429)

Obedience of Pisa (1409–1415)
 Jean-Allarmet de Brogny (1409–1415)

Bishops of Ostia and Velletri (1415-1914)

 Jean-Allarmet de Brogny (1415–1426)
 Antonio Correr, 1431–1445
 Juan de Cervantes (1447–1453)
 Giorgio Fieschi (1455–1461)
 Guillaume d'Estouteville (1461–1483)
 Giuliano della Rovere, became Pope Julius II (1483–1503),
 Oliviero Carafa (1503–1511)
 Raffaele Riario Sansoni (1511–1521)
 Bernardino López de Carvajal (1521–1523)
 Francesco Soderini (1523–1524)
 Niccolò Fieschi (1524) 
 Alessandro Farnese, became Pope Paul III(1524–1534)
 Giovanni Piccolomini, 1535–1537
 Giovanni Domenico de Cupis, 1537–1553
 Giovanni Pietro Carafa, 1553–1555
 Jean du Bellay 1555–1560
 François de Tournon, 1560–1562
 Rodolfo Pio da Carpi, 1562–1564
 Francesco Pisani, 1564–1570
 Giovanni Morone, 1570–1580
 Alessandro II Farnese, 1580–1589
 Giovanni Antonio Serbelloni, 1589–1591
 Alfonso Gesualdo, 1591–1603
 Tolomeo Gallio, 1603–1607
 Domenico Pinelli, 1607–1611
 François de Joyeuse, 1611–1615
 Antonio Maria Galli, 1615–1620
 Antonio Maria Sauli, 1620–1623
 Francesco Maria Bourbon del Monte, 1623–1626
 Ottavio Bandini, 1626–1629
 Giovanni Battista Deti, 1629–1630
 Domenico Ginnasi, 1630–1639
 Carlo Emanuele Pio di Savoia, 1639–1641
 Marcello Lante della Rovere, 1641–1652
 Carlo I de Medici, 1652–1666
 Francesco V Barberini, 1666–1679
 Cesare Facchinetti, 1680–1683
 Niccolò Albergati-Ludovisi, 1683–1687
 Alderano Cybo, 1687–1700
 Emmanuel Théodose de la Tour d'Auvergne, 1700–1715 
 Nicola Acciaoiuli, 1715–1719 
 Fulvio Astalli, 1719–1721 
 Sebastiano Antonio Tanara, 1721–1724 
 Francesco del Giudice, 1724–1725 
 Fabrizio Paolucci, 1725–1726
 Francesco Barberini, 1726–1738
 Pietro Ottoboni, 1738–1740
 Tommaso Ruffo, 1740–1753
 Pierluigi Carafa, 1753–1755
 Rainiero d'Elci, 1755–1761
 Giuseppe Spinelli, 1761–1763
 Carlo Alberto Guidoboni Cavalchini, 1763–1774
 Fabrizio Serbelloni, 1774–1775
 Gian Francesco Albani, 1775–1803
 Henry Benedict Stuart, 1803–1807
 Leonardo Antonelli, 1807–1811
 Alessandro Mattei, 1814–1820
 Giulio Maria della Somaglia, 1820–1830
 Bartolomeo Pacca, 1830–1844
 Ludovico Micara, O. Cap., 1844–1847
 Vincenzo Macchi, 1847–1860
 Mario Mattei, 1860–1870
 Costantino Patrizi Naro, 1870–1876
 Luigi Amat di San Filippo e Sorso, 1877–1878
 Camillo di Pietro, 1878–1884
 Carlo Sacconi, 1884–1889
 Raffaele Monaco La Valletta, 1889–1896
 Luigi Oreglia di Santo Stefano, 1896–1913

Bishops of Ostia 1914-
 Serafino Vannutelli (1914–1915)
 Vincenzo Vannutelli, (1915–1930)
 Granito Pignatelli (1933–1948)
 Francesco Marchetti-Selvaggiani (1948–1951)
 Eugène Tisserant (1951–1972)
 Amleto Giovanni Cicognani (1972–1973)
 Luigi Traglia (1974–1977)
 Carlo Confalonieri (1977–1986)
 Agnelo Rossi (1986–1993)
 Bernardin Gantin (1993–2002)
 Joseph Ratzinger, became Pope Benedict XVI (2002-2005)
 Angelo Sodano (2005-2019)
 Giovanni Battista Re (2020-)

See also
Diocese of Rome#Diocese of Ostia
Roman Catholic Suburbicarian Diocese of Velletri–Segni

References

Books

Brixius, Johannes M.  Die Mitglieder des Kardinalskollegiums von 1130-1181, Berlin 1912.

  (in Latin) 
 (in Latin) 
 
 
Gauchat, Patritius (1935). Hierarchia catholica Volumen quartum (IV) Münster.

Hüls, Rudolf.  Kardinäle, Klerus und Kirchen Roms: 1049–1130, Bibliothek des Deutschen Historischen Instituts in Rom 1977

Klewitz, Hans-Walter.  Reformpapsttum und Kardinalkolleg, Darmstadt 1957.
Lanzoni, Francesco (1927). Le diocesi d'Italia, dalle origini al principio del secolo VII (anno 604). Volume primo. Faenza: F. Lega.

 (in Latin)
 (in Latin)

 
Suburbicarian dioceses
Ostia